Chalinidae is a family of marine demosponges, containing the following genera:
 Chalinula Schmidt, 1868
 Cladocroce Topsent, 1892
 Dendrectilla Pulitzer-Finali, 1983
 Dendroxea Griessinger, 1971
 Haliclona Grant, 1836

Predators
An unidentified species from the family Chalinidae is a prey of the sea slug Tyrinna evelinae in Brazil.

References

 
Sponge families